The 1993 Waterford Senior Hurling Championship was the 93rd staging of the Waterford Senior Hurling Championship since its establishment by the Waterford County Board in 1897.

Ballygunner were the defending champions.

On 3 October 1993, Lismore won the championship after an 0-08 to 0-07 defeat of Passage in the final. This was their third championship title overall and their first title since 1991. It remains their last championship victory.

References

Waterford Senior Hurling Championship
Waterford Senior Hurling Championship